Union City High School is a comprehensive four-year public high school in Union City, in Obion County, Tennessee, Tennessee, United States, operating as the lone secondary school of the Union City School District. 

As of the 2018–19 school year, the school had an enrollment of 450 students and 34.7 classroom teachers (on an FTE basis), for a student–teacher ratio of 13.0:1.

Notable alumni
 Jovante Moffatt (born 1996), American football safety for the Cleveland Browns of the National Football League.
 Stephen Vaden (born 1982, class of 2000), Judge of the United States Court of International Trade.

References

External links
 

Obion County, Tennessee
Public high schools in Tennessee